This Is Not The Green Fury is the preceding EP to Matt Pond PA's third full-length album The Green Fury. Originally released on limited edition 7" green vinyl at the end of 2001, the vinyl is now out of print, but This Is Not The Green Fury is available as a digital download through iTunes and Amazon MP3.

Track listing
 "A List Of Sound" – 3:29
 "1.03" – 1:03
 "Night's End" – 2:40
 "Measure 4" – 2:17

Personnel
Jim Hostetter – cello
Eve Miller – vocals, cello
Mike Kennedy – drums
Jim Kehoe – electric guitar
Matt Raisch – bass
Matt Pond – guitar, vocals
Rosie McNamara-Jones – violin
Josh Kramer – electric guitar
Brian McTear – banjo, organ, bass, drums, vocals
Brendan Kilroy – double bass

Technical personnel
Produced by Brian McTear and Matt Pond
Engineered by Brian McTear at MinerStreet/CycleSound
Mastered by John Baker at Maja Audio Group

Matt Pond PA EPs
2001 EPs
Polyvinyl Record Co. EPs